BBQ USA is an American cooking documentary series that airs on Food Network. It also streams on Discovery+. The show follows Michael Symon as he explores the art of barbecuing around the United States by traveling to BBQ competitions. It premiered on July 11, 2022.

Episodes

Production

The show was announced on June 8, 2022, as a six-episode series featuring restaurateur and chef Michael Symon travelling to barbecue competitions around the United States to explore the art of barbecuing in the country. As part of his assignment, Symon speaks with barbecue fans, cooks, barbecue experts and pitmasters while testing the taste of the food.

The series is produced by Simple Alien for Food Network where it airs weekly, and Discovery+ which streams it simultaneously. The show premiered on July 11, 2022. The season finale aired on August 15, 2022.

In January 2023, Symon announced that the second season was being filmed in Cleveland.

References

External links
 
 

2020s American cooking television series
2022 American television series debuts
Documentary television series
English-language television shows
Food Network original programming
Food reality television series
Television series by Simple Alien